William Davin (19 February 1890 – 1 March 1956) was an Irish Labour Party politician who served as a Teachta Dála (TD) for over thirty years. He was also a station-master.

His first candidacy for public office was at the 1922 general election, when he stood as a Labour Party candidate in the Leix–Offaly constituency. He was returned to the 3rd Dáil, and was re-elected at each successive general election until his death in office in 1956. Following his death, a by-election was held on 30 April 1956 which was won by the Fianna Fáil candidate Kieran Egan.

He was Parliamentary Secretary to the Minister for Local Government from 1954 to 1956.

For most of this period, he was the only Labour deputy from Laois–Offaly, but after the June 1927 general election he was joined in the short-lived 5th Dáil by John Gill, who lost his seat at the September 1927 general election.

Since Davin's death, Laois–Offaly has returned a Labour TD only twice: at the 1965 general election, when Henry Byrne was elected to the 18th Dáil, and at the 1992 general election, when Pat Gallagher was elected to the 27th Dáil.

References

External links

1890 births
1956 deaths
Labour Party (Ireland) TDs
Members of the 3rd Dáil
Members of the 4th Dáil
Members of the 5th Dáil
Members of the 6th Dáil
Members of the 7th Dáil
Members of the 8th Dáil
Members of the 9th Dáil
Members of the 10th Dáil
Members of the 11th Dáil
Members of the 12th Dáil
Members of the 13th Dáil
Members of the 14th Dáil
Members of the 15th Dáil
Parliamentary Secretaries of the 15th Dáil